Chaatta is a Malayalam film directed by Bharathan in 1981. Balan K. Nair, Nedumudi Venu, Shubha and K. P. A. C. Lalitha play the main roles. Johnson composed the musical score.

Cast

References

External links 
 
 

Films directed by Bharathan